Gaëtan Haas (born 31 January 1992) is a Swiss professional ice hockey centre who currently serves as captain of EHC Biel of the National League (NL). Haas previously played in the National Hockey League (NHL) with the Edmonton Oilers. He won one NL title with SC Bern in 2019.

Playing career
In the midst of the 2016–17 season, his eighth professional season with EHC Biel, on 10 November 2016, he agreed to a three-year contract with SC Bern worth CHF 1.2 million. The contract started from the 2017–18 season and ran through the 2019–20 season. In his first season with SC Bern, Haas drew attention from the Calgary Flames, Montreal Canadiens and Chicago Blackhawks of the National Hockey League (NHL).

On 28 January 2019, Haas agreed to an early one-year contract extension worth CHF 800,000 with SC Bern through the 2020–21 season.

Undrafted, Haas, in the following off-season, used his NHL out clause with SC Bern in order to sign a one-year, entry-level contract with the Edmonton Oilers of the NHL on 1 July 2019. Haas made the Oilers' opening night roster, playing in his first NHL game on 3 October. He went on to score his first NHL goal on 5 November against the Arizona Coyotes after a short two-game stint with the Bakersfield Condors of the American Hockey League (AHL).

On 28 April 2020, Haas agreed to a one-year contract extension with the Oilers worth $915,000.

Haas was loaned to SC Bern for the start of the 2020–21 season. He played 14 games with Bern before returning to Edmonton at the end of December.

On 10 June 2021, Haas returned to EHC Biel on a five-year deal.

On August 27, 2021, Haas was named captain of EHC Biel.

International play

Haas participated at the 2012 World Junior Ice Hockey Championships as a member of the Switzerland men's national junior ice hockey team.

Haas was named to Switzerland men's team for the 2016, 2017, 2018 and 2019 World Championships. He also made the 2018 Winter Olympics team.

Career statistics

Regular season and playoffs

International

Awards and honours

References

External links
 
 

1992 births
Living people
HC Ajoie players
Bakersfield Condors players
Expatriate ice hockey players in Canada
Expatriate ice hockey players in the United States
EHC Biel players
Edmonton Oilers players
Ice hockey players at the 2018 Winter Olympics
Ice hockey players at the 2022 Winter Olympics
Olympic ice hockey players of Switzerland
SC Bern players
Swiss expatriate sportspeople in Canada
Swiss expatriate sportspeople in the United States
Swiss ice hockey centres
Undrafted National Hockey League players
People from Biel/Bienne
Sportspeople from the canton of Bern
Swiss expatriate ice hockey people